Moris Zano (born 8 May 1958) is an Israeli former footballer.

Zano was born in Morocco and moved to Israel at a young age and grew up in Ashkelon. Zano started playing football for Hapoel Ashkelon and at age 16 he joined to the senior. After enlisting exams approached Air Force football championship, where he met Hapoel Tel Aviv soccer player Ya'akov Ekhoiz, who recommended him to join to Hapoel. Hapoel Tel Aviv wanted join the player to the club, but Ashkelon created difficulties for the transition, and Jano came for closure. During the year, it did not play a severed connection between the player and Hapoel Tel Aviv, and in 1980 he signed with Hapoel Be'er Sheva. On the 24th round, he scored against Hapoel Tel Aviv at the time fought for the championship. At the end of the game won Hapoel Tel Aviv 1-2 and coach, David Schweitzer, came up to Zano and asked him to contact him at the end of the season. After winning the championship, signing Hapoel Tel Aviv in summer 1981. At his debut at Hapoel Tel Aviv, scored his first goal against Hapoel Jerusalem. With Hapoel he won the championship in 1986 and 1988. In 1991, he moved to Hapoel Ashdod.

On 15 February 1983 he made his debut at Israel national football team against Belgium, On 11 January 1984 he made his last cap at the national team against Portugal.

References

1958 births
Israeli Jews
20th-century Moroccan Jews
Living people
Israeli footballers
Hapoel Ashkelon F.C. players
Hapoel Be'er Sheva F.C. players
Hapoel Tel Aviv F.C. players
Hapoel Ashdod F.C. players
Moroccan emigrants to Israel
Footballers from Ashkelon
Israeli football managers
Hapoel Ashkelon F.C. managers
Association football midfielders
Association football forwards